The Synechococcales are an order of cyanobacteria, with over 70 genera. It includes both filamentous and single-celled types.

References

 
Bacteria orders